The 2007 NCAA Division I Outdoor Track and Field Championships were the 66th NCAA Men's Division I Outdoor Track and Field Championships and the 26th NCAA Women's Division I Outdoor Track and Field Championships at Hornet Stadium in Sacramento, California on the campus of the California State University, Sacramento. In total, thirty-six different men's and women's track and field events were contested.

Results

Men's events

100 meters
Final results shown, not prelims

200 meters

400 meters

800 meters

1500 meters

3000 meters steeplechase

5000 meters

10,000 meters

110 meters hurdles
Final results shown, not prelims

400 meters hurdles

4x100-meter relay
Final results shown, not prelims

4x400-meter relay
Final results shown, not prelims

High Jump
Only top eight final results shown; no prelims are listed

Pole Vault
Only top eight final results shown; no prelims are listed

Long Jump
Only top eight final results shown; no prelims are listed

Triple Jump
Only top eight final results shown; no prelims are listed

Shot Put
Only top eight final results shown; no prelims are listed

Discus
Only top eight final results shown; no prelims are listed

Hammer Throw
Only top eight final results shown; no prelims are listed

Javelin Throw
Only top eight final results shown; no prelims are listed

References

NCAA Men's Outdoor Track and Field Championship
NCAA Division I Outdoor Track And Field Championships
NCAA Division I Outdoor Track And Field Championships
NCAA Division I Outdoor Track and Field Championships
NCAA Women's Outdoor Track and Field Championship